The Boeing Model 306 was the designation for a series of aircraft drafted in 1935 that achieved neither design nor production status. They included the Model 306 bomber, Model 306 flying boat, and Model 306A airliner.

Design
In 1935, Boeing drafted several configurations of aircraft loosely based on both the Boeing XB-15 research and experience with the Boeing 314 Clipper aircraft. Each design was a "tailless" variation of those existing models with a flying wing layout, or a creative extension of the theme. They all featured extended trailing aileron/elevators that could perform their function without disrupting the wing performance. The wings were consistently swept about 35 degrees. The immaturity of the designs is evident in the flying boat drawings, which feature neither outrigger pontoons nor stabilising sponsons to keep the aircraft upright in the water. Each land based design featured tricycle landing gear as a feature when taildragger configurations were the standard of the time.

Variants
Boeing Model 306 bomber
 A heavy bomber with a family resemblance to the Boeing XB-15, to use Allison V-1710 engines.
Boeing Model 306 flying boat
A flying boat with a fuselage similar to the Boeing 314, to use Allison V-1710s.
Boeing Model 306A airliner
Airliner design, to use four Pratt & Whitney Hornet S1EG radials paired in a push-pull configuration.

Specifications (Model 306)

References

306
1930s United States airliners